Notiobia is a genus of ground beetles in the family Carabidae. There are about 100 described species in Notiobia.

Species
These 100 species belong to the genus Notiobia:

 Notiobia acuminata Arndt & Wrase, 2001
 Notiobia aeneola Putzeys, 1878
 Notiobia aethiopica Facchini, 2015
 Notiobia aguilarorum Noonan, 1981
 Notiobia angustula (Chaudoir, 1878)
 Notiobia aulica (Dejean, 1829)
 Notiobia bamboutensis (Basilewsky, 1949)
 Notiobia bradytoides (Bates, 1891)
 Notiobia brevicollis (Chaudoir, 1837)
 Notiobia cephala (Casey, 1914)
 Notiobia chalcea (Brullé, 1838)
 Notiobia chalcitis (Germar, 1823)
 Notiobia chiriquensis Bates, 1884
 Notiobia concinna (Erichson, 1847)
 Notiobia concolor Putzeys, 1878
 Notiobia cooperi Noonan, 1973
 Notiobia cupreola Bates, 1878
 Notiobia cupripennis (Germar, 1823)
 Notiobia curlettii Facchini, 2003
 Notiobia cyanippa (Bates, 1882)
 Notiobia dampierii (Laporte, 1867)
 Notiobia demeyeri Facchini, 2015
 Notiobia denisonensis (Laporte, 1867)
 Notiobia diffusa (Klug, 1833)
 Notiobia disparilis Bates, 1878
 Notiobia dohrnii (Murray, 1858)
 Notiobia dubia Putzeys, 1878
 Notiobia edwardsii (Laporte, 1867)
 Notiobia elgonensis (Basilewsky, 1948)
 Notiobia ewarti Noonan, 1973
 Notiobia feana (Basilewsky, 1949)
 Notiobia flavicincta (Erichson, 1847)
 Notiobia flavipalpis (W.J.MacLeay, 1864)
 Notiobia flebilis (LeConte, 1863)
 Notiobia germari (Laporte, 1867)
 Notiobia glabrata Arndt, 1998
 Notiobia hilariola (Bates, 1891)
 Notiobia inaequalipennis (Laporte, 1867)
 Notiobia incerta Bates, 1882
 Notiobia iridipennis (Chaudoir, 1843)
 Notiobia jucunda Putzeys, 1878
 Notiobia kinolae (Basilewsky, 1976)
 Notiobia kivuensis (Burgeon, 1936)
 Notiobia lamprota (Bates, 1882)
 Notiobia lapeyrousei (Laporte, 1867)
 Notiobia laticollis (W.J.MacLeay, 1888)
 Notiobia latiuscula (Emden, 1953)
 Notiobia leiroides Bates, 1878
 Notiobia leonensis (Basilewsky, 1949)
 Notiobia longipennis Putzeys, 1878
 Notiobia lucidicollis (Dejean, 1829)
 Notiobia maculicornis (Chaudoir, 1843)
 Notiobia maxima Arndt, 1998
 Notiobia melaena Bates, 1882
 Notiobia melanaria (Dejean, 1829)
 Notiobia mexicana (Dejean, 1829)
 Notiobia moffetti Noonan, 1981
 Notiobia nebrioides Perty, 1830
 Notiobia nigrans (W.J.MacLeay, 1888)
 Notiobia nitidipennis (LeConte, 1847)
 Notiobia oblongula Lorenz, 1998
 Notiobia obscura Bates, 1882
 Notiobia ovata (Chaudoir, 1878)
 Notiobia overlaeti (Burgeon, 1936)
 Notiobia pallipes Bates, 1882
 Notiobia papuella (Darlington, 1968)
 Notiobia papuensis (W.J.MacLeay, 1876)
 Notiobia patrueloides (Laporte, 1867)
 Notiobia peratra (Sloane, 1920)
 Notiobia peruviana (Dejean, 1829)
 Notiobia picina (Chaudoir, 1878)
 Notiobia planiuscula (Chaudoir, 1878)
 Notiobia planoimpressa (Laporte, 1867)
 Notiobia polita (W.J.MacLeay, 1888)
 Notiobia praeclara Putzeys, 1878
 Notiobia pseudolimbipennis Arndt, 1998
 Notiobia pujoli (Basilewsky, 1968)
 Notiobia purpurascens (Bates, 1882)
 Notiobia quadricollis (Chaudoir, 1878)
 Notiobia rectangula (Chaudoir, 1878)
 Notiobia ruficruris (Brullé, 1838)
 Notiobia rugosipennis (Laporte, 1867)
 Notiobia ruwenzorica (Burgeon, 1936)
 Notiobia sanctithomae (A.Serrano, 1995)
 Notiobia sayi (Blatchley, 1910)
 Notiobia schlingeri Noonan, 1973
 Notiobia schnusei (Emden, 1953)
 Notiobia sculptipennis (Laporte, 1867)
 Notiobia sericipennis (W.J.MacLeay, 1888)
 Notiobia similis Putzeys, 1878
 Notiobia smithii (Murray, 1858)
 Notiobia tagliaferrii Facchini, 2003
 Notiobia terminata (Say, 1823)
 Notiobia tucumana (Dejean, 1831)
 Notiobia uluguruana (Basilewsky, 1962)
 Notiobia variabilis Arndt & Wrase, 2001
 Notiobia virescens (Dejean, 1831)
 Notiobia viridipennis (Sloane, 1920)
 Notiobia viridula (Dejean, 1829)
 Notiobia wilkensii (Chaudoir, 1837)

References

External links

 

Harpalinae